Graduate School of Science and Faculty of Science (京都大学大学院理学研究科・理学部) is one of schools at the Kyoto University. The Faculty (undergraduate school) and the graduate School operate as one.

Divisions and facilities 
The Faculty of Science comprises the following departments and facilities;

Divisions 
 Mathematics and Mathematical Sciences
 Physics and Astronomy
 Earth and Planetary Sciences
 Chemistry
 Biological Sciences

Facilities 
 Astronomical Observatory
 Data Analysis Center for Geomagnetism
 Institute for Geothermal Sciences
 Aso Volcanological Laboratory

Rankings 
According to the QS World University Rankings by Subject 2022, Kyoto University is ranked second in Japan and 25th in the world in the field of Natural Sciences.

In Kawaijuku's 2022 Entrance Examination Ranking, the school received score 65.0, the highest of any natural science school in western Japan.

Notable alumni

Nobel Laureates 
 Hideki Yukawa, Physics, 1949
 Shinichiro Tomonaga, Physics, 1965
 Susumu Tonegawa, Physiology or Medicine, 1987
 Isamu Akasaki, Physics, 2014

Engineering fields medalists 

 Heisuke Hironaka, 1970
 Shigefumi Mori, 1990

References

External links 
 

Sciemce